Ghazan II was the last nominal ruler of the Ilkhanate.

Life 
His existence is known through works of medieval authors and numismatics, but otherwise is unattested in history. He appears to have been a puppet of Malek Ashraf in 1356. According to Abū Bakr al-Qutbī al-Ahrī, author of Tarikh-i Uways, when Jani Beg demanded Malek Ashraf to submit in 1357, he replied: "He is the padishah of the ulus of Berke, he has nothing to do with the ulus of Abaqa, for here the ruler is Ghazan and the emirate is mine." He was mentioned by Nur al-Din Azhdari in his Ghazan-nama, whose father Shams al-Din Muhammad served Ghazan II. 

His coins have been minted in Mardin (1356), Qom (1357), Soltaniyeh, Maragha, Ray, Ani, Barda, Ganja, Khoy, Mamaqan, Nakhchivan, Sharur, Tabriz, Tbilisi, Urmia and others.

References 

Il-Khan emperors
1357 deaths
14th-century monarchs in Asia